Lucky Jordan is a 1942 film directed by Frank Tuttle, starring Alan Ladd in his first leading role, Helen Walker in her film debut, and Sheldon Leonard. The screenplay concerns a self-centered gangster who tangles with Nazi spies.

Plot
During World War II, gangster Lucky Jordan (Alan Ladd) is drafted into the Army and sent to a training base near his New York home office.

Jordan avoids the rigors of boot camp by hiding out in the unit's canteen. But one of the attendants, Jill Evans (Helen Walker), reports him to the base colonel. As a result, he is thrown in the stockade but later escapes by stealing an army engineer's car. Outside the camp, Jordan is run off the road by two thugs, but they drive away when Jill happens onto the scene. Jordan then forces Jill to accompany him to New York City. She responds by angrily throwing out a briefcase containing Army documents. After sneaking back into his downtown office, Jordan learns from a disloyal underling, Slip (Sheldon Leonard), that the two goons he encountered outside the base were after the briefcase Jill discarded. Further, a spy ring is offering $50,000 for it. So after they retrieve the briefcase and its classified documents, Jordan orders Slip to arrange an exchange. But later, the thugs surprise Jordan and abscond with the valuable secrets after knocking him cold.

Once recovered, Jordan tracks the spy ring to a botanical preserve on Long Island. There, he finds Slip and a traitor named Kilpatrick (Miles Mander) holding the papers. Jordan manages to grab them and run off. The preserve's exits are immediately locked, but Jordan hides the papers and an explanatory note inside a man's rolled-up umbrella. Meanwhile, Jill has trailed the AWOL Jordan to the preserve. Once inside, she asks a guard for use of a phone to notify authorities of Jordan's location. Instead, he puts her through to Kilpatrick, who masquerades as a government agent. Totally deceived, she assists in the capture of Jordan. Herr Kesselman (John Wengraf), the spy ring's chief, oversees an interrogation of Jordan, who while under threat of torture quickly invents a story concerning where he supposedly hid the papers.

After he is left alone with Kesselman and a lone guard, Jordan wrestles away his gun. He then tells Kesselman he will turn over the papers to the government out of a sense of new-found patriotism. The FBI arrives and nabs the entire ring. Jill tells Lucky he will probably get a medal, but instead he is returned to the stockade to serve out the rest of his punishment.

Cast

Alan Ladd as Lucky Jordan
Helen Walker as Jill Evans
Sheldon Leonard as Slip Moran
Mabel Paige as Annie
Marie McDonald as Pearl, Lucky's secretary
Lloyd Corrigan as Ernest Higgins
Dave Willock as Angelo Palacio
Russell Hoyt as Eddie
John Wengraf as Herr Kesselman
Miles Mander as Kilpatrick
Clem Bevans as Gas station attendant
Anthony Caruso as Hired Gun / Gardener
Charles Cane as Sergeant
George Meader as Little Man
Virginia Brissac as Little Man's Wife
Kitty Kelly as Vera Maggotti
George Humbert as Joe Maggotti
Al Hill as First Killer
Fred Kohler Jr. as Second Killer

Production
The film was based on an original screenplay by Charles Leonard, Prelude to Glory, about a gangster who joins the army. Paramount bought it in March 1942 as a vehicle for Alan Ladd. Karl Tunberg and Darrell Ware were put to work rewriting it. It was Ladd's second film since becoming a star and would be the first where he was billed alone above the title. The movie was retitled Lucky Jordan in July.

Paulette Goddard was announced as Ladd's co-star and Frank Tuttle was assigned to direct.
Marie McDonald, who had just signed with Paramount, was given the role of Ladd's secretary.

Goddard eventually dropped out and her part was taken by Helen Walker. Walker had only arrived in Hollywood a month before being cast; she had been signed by Paramount on the basis of her Broadway success in Jason. This was her first film role.

Mabel Paige was cast off the back of her success in Young and Willing.

The briefcase used by Alan Ladd in the film is the same briefcase he used as Raven in This Gun for Hire – the actor considered the prop good luck.

Reception
The film broke the house record at New York's Rialto cinema in its first year of release.

References

External links

Review of film at New York Times

 

1942 films
American spy films
American black-and-white films
Films directed by Frank Tuttle
Films scored by Adolph Deutsch
Paramount Pictures films
World War II films made in wartime
World War II spy films
1940s English-language films